I Teoremi is the first and only album by the Italian progressive rock band I Teoremi, released in 1972.

The music in this album is more like Led Zeppelin style hard rock but the overall sound is more progressive due to the imaginative rhythm section. The music highlights the electric guitar but it is actually the bassist that steals the show. The keyboards (piano) are featured in only one of the tracks. The album is generally not considered a very progressive album in the true meaning of the word but a good album nevertheless.

Personnel
I TEOREMI 7" with Tito gallo (voice) recorded a  7” in 1971 
Sognare and  Tutte le cose
Original by Jethro Tull,  ("With you there to help me")
 Tito Gallo - Voice
 Mario Schilirò - Guitar
 Aldo Bellanova - Bass
 Claudio Mastracci - Drums

•	I TEOREMI  LP was recorded in 1972

	Vincenzo Massetti: voice 
•	Mario Schilirò: guitar
•	Aldo Bellanova: bass
•	Claudio Mastracci: drums

Track listing
 Impressione
 Mare della tranquillità
 Passi da gigante
 Nuvola che copri il sole
 Qualcosa d'irreale
 Il dialogo d'un pazzo
 A chi non ci sarà più
•	
•
•	
•	Some production house combined the two records in one
•

See also
Italian progressive rock

External links

Notes

1972 albums